The 1980 Masters (officially the 1980 Benson & Hedges Masters) was a professional non-ranking snooker tournament that took place from Tuesday 5th to Saturday 9 February 1980 at the Wembley Conference Centre in London, England. 10 players were invited for the tournament. The event had previously been played from Monday to Friday but was switched to have a Saturday finish.

Terry Griffiths won the Masters by beating Alex Higgins, just 9 months after winning the World Championship. Higgins made his third final in a row. Griffiths won the title by 9–5 with a break of 131. An attendance of 2,323 attended the Conference Centre for final session of the match, which was a record at the time.

Main draw

Final

Century breaks
Total: 2
 131, 100  Terry Griffiths

References 

1980
Masters
Masters (snooker)
Masters (snooker)
February 1980 sports events in the United Kingdom